East Sheen Football Club was an English football and rugby club from Surrey in England.

History
The club was one of the first to be active in Surrey and started off playing rugby union rules.  The club's first reported matches under the association code were in the first Surrey Senior Cup in 1882.  It is a measure of the lack of competition in Surrey that the club reached the first final in the tournament, and the most successful club in the 1880s, Reigate Priory, who reached the first five finals, had only ever won one FA Cup tie.

One notable fixture was in the first round of the Surrey Cup in 1887–88.  The club had originally lost to Barnes F.C., but put in a protest, on the basis that darkness had ended the match early, which the Surrey Football Association upheld.  The replayed match saw only eight Barnes players turn up to face only ten from East Sheen; despite this, Barnes won by ten goals to nil.  The club had been handicapped by the emigration and retirement of a number of players, leaving the club denuded of backs and half-backs.

The Sheenites finally entered the national Cup in 1887-88, and were drawn away at Old St Mark's.  The club was one goal behind at half-time, but conceded four in the second half, to go out by seven goals to two.

The club's last rugby match seems to have taken place in 1898, a defeat by five goals and two tries to Oxford University R.F.C.

By 1904 the club was sometimes struggling to raise a team, and before the start of the 1905–06 season, the club was left without a ground.  Given the club had long been struggling for crowds, it seems to have dissolved at the end of the season.

Grounds

The club's home matches were originally played on Sheen Common, three-quarters of a mile from Mortlake railway station or at a field in Barnes.  By 1886 the club had its own enclosed ground in East Sheen, and in 1898 the club was playing at Mortlake.  From 1900 until 1905 it played at the St Margaret's ground, which was notorious for its lack of facilities, with no stands and a pavilion with obstructed views.

Colours

The earliest recorded colours for the club are narrow blue and white hooped shirts, white knickers, and scarlet stockings, in 1876–77.  By 1886 the club was wearing red and green, and by 1888 light and dark blue, probably in halves as that was a popular combination.

Notable players

Future England backs A.M. and P.M. Walters both played for the club in the 1883–84 season, the latter continuing to 1885, and gaining representative honours by playing in the South v North match that year while with the club.

Honours

FA Cup:

Best performance: 1st round, 1887–88

London Senior Cup:

Best performance: 2nd round, 1899–1900

Surrey Senior Cup:

Winners: 1884–85, 1899–1900
Runners-up: 1882–83

References

Association football clubs established in 1873
Defunct football clubs in Surrey
Football clubs in Surrey